James B. Nutter & Company is a privately owned mortgage banking firm headquartered in Kansas City, Mo. It is one of the oldest and largest such firms in the United States, servicing $7 billion in mortgages and making loans in all 50 states. 
James B. Nutter & Co. offers products and services such as conventional mortgages; FHA mortgages; VA mortgages; reverse  mortgages; USDA (United States Department of Agriculture) mortgages; no closing cost refinancing; and HARP (Home Affordable Refinance Program) refinancing options.
The company is known for its philanthropy, historic preservation and efforts to promote racial equality and diversity. 
James B. Nutter & Company acquired a wide swath of older homes in Kansas City’s historic Westport neighborhood and turned them into a collection of eclectic, entrepreneurial office spaces known as Nutterville. The formerly drab houses were renovated and painted in bright colors and surrounded by flower beds. The work has included the preservation of the historic Nathan Scarritt House at 4038 Baltimore Ave.

Background
James B. Nutter Sr. founded James B. Nutter & Company In 1951, working out of his apartment. Nutter specialized in home loans and refinancing home loans. James B. Nutter & Company was one of the first Kansas City mortgage companies to get government-backed Veterans Administration home loans.
In 1964, with foreclosure rates on the rise, Nutter’s company created a forbearance program to help borrowers who were behind on their house payments.
In the 1950s and ‘60s, James B. Nutter & Company did not follow the discriminatory lending practices of the day and became one of the first companies in the industry to make home loans in black neighborhoods and to single women on a large scale. James B. Nutter & Company continued to countermand discriminatory practices in the 1970s, when its Village Green apartments rented units to anyone who could pay the rent, regardless of race.
In November 2012, Nutter received the Harold L. Holliday Sr. Civil Rights Award from the NAACP’s Kansas City, Mo. Branch.
During the subprime mortgage crisis in 2006 and 2007, the financial media recognized James B. Nutter & Company for its refusal to participate in junk loan transactions.
James B. Nutter & Company. was a pioneer in reverse mortgages, having initiated the first Federal Housing Administration-insured reverse mortgages in 1989.

Employees
The James B. Nutter & Company,  employs  ~200 loan officers, processors and support staff at its headquarters in Kansas City’s historic Westport neighborhood. The current CEO is James B. Nutter.

Philanthropy
The company has been recognized by many non-profits, given the company's history of donating. Some recognition includes: the John "Buck" O'Neil Award for outstanding support of the Negro Leagues Baseball Museum;  Children’s Mercy Hospital; board representation for Harry S. Truman Library Institute; Little Sisters of the Poor; Gordon Parks Elementary School;  Jackson County (Mo.) Historical Society (6); Truman Medical Center, American Red Cross, Rockhurst University, University of Missouri – Kansas City, Kansas City Art Institute, the Learning Exchange, Habitat for Humanity, Science City at Union Station, Jackson County Historical Society and others

References

External links

Financial services companies established in 1951
Mortgage lenders of the United States
1951 establishments in Missouri